Alessandra Perilli (born April 1, 1988) is a Sammarinese professional target shooter. Her hometown is Borgo Maggiore. She finished 4th after a draw for 2nd place with a French and a Slovakian shooter in the Women's trap at the 2012 Summer Olympics. She won San Marino's first ever Olympic medal, a bronze, in Women's Trap at the 2020 Summer Olympics.

Biography
She competed for San Marino at the 2016 Summer Olympics in Rio de Janeiro. She finished 13th in the qualifications for women's trap and did not qualify for the finals. She was the flag bearer for San Marino in the Parade of Nations. She competed for San Marino at the 2020 Summer Olympics in Tokyo, where she won the bronze medal in women's trap, becoming the first Olympic medalist for San Marino in history. Days later, she added a silver medal with Gian Marco Berti in the mixed team trap event.

References

External links
 
 

Living people
Sammarinese female sport shooters
Trap and double trap shooters
Shooters at the 2012 Summer Olympics
Shooters at the 2016 Summer Olympics
Olympic shooters of San Marino
1988 births
Sportspeople from Rimini
Sammarinese people of Italian descent
Shooters at the 2015 European Games
European Games bronze medalists for San Marino
European Games medalists in shooting
Mediterranean Games gold medalists for San Marino
Mediterranean Games bronze medalists for San Marino
Competitors at the 2009 Mediterranean Games
Competitors at the 2013 Mediterranean Games
Competitors at the 2018 Mediterranean Games
Mediterranean Games medalists in shooting
Shooters at the 2019 European Games
Shooters at the 2020 Summer Olympics
Medalists at the 2020 Summer Olympics
Olympic medalists in shooting
Olympic silver medalists for San Marino
Olympic bronze medalists for San Marino